Abdul Hafeez Khan is an Indian politician . He has been a member of the YSR Congress Party since 2011. He represented Kurnool in the 2019 Andhra Pradesh Legislative Assembly election gaining 72,819 votes representing a 47.70% share of the vote in the constituency. He is the First Public Representative and Member of Legislative Assembly in India Who came forward to perform Final Religious Rituals as per their religion and tradition with proper sendoff to the People who died due to Covid19 Disease and created awareness among people of Andhra Pradesh about the Pandamic.

References 

Year of birth missing (living people)
Living people
YSR Congress Party politicians
Andhra Pradesh MLAs 2019–2024